John E. Powers (November 10, 1910 – July 31, 1998) was an American politician who served as President of the Massachusetts Senate from 1959 to 1964.

Powers, a former clam digger, messenger, and machine operator, served as a State Senator from Boston from 1940 to 1964 and Supreme Judicial Court of Suffolk County from 1964 to 1988. He was twice a candidate for Mayor of Boston. He lost to incumbent John B. Hynes in the 1955 mayoral election. Following Hynes' retirement, Powers became the front-runner for the mayorship, however he lost to Boston City Council member John F. Collins in the 1959 mayoral election, despite having the most votes in the preliminary election amongst five candidates.

Powers is remembered on the Boston Irish Heritage Trail.

See also
 Massachusetts legislature: 1939, 1941–1942, 1943–1944, 1945–1946, 1947–1948, 1949–1950, 1951–1952, 1953–1954, 1955–1956, 1957–1958, 1959–1960, 1961–1962, 1963–1964

References 

1910 births
1998 deaths
Massachusetts state senators
Politicians from Boston
Presidents of the Massachusetts Senate
20th-century American politicians
American people of Irish descent